Kasper Harlem Fosser (born 1999) is a Norwegian orienteering competitor who represents Norwegian club IL Heming and Swedish club IFK Göteborg. He won a silver medal at the 2019 World Orienteering Championships in Østfold, and has won gold medals in both long distance, middle distance and relay in the Junior World Orienteering Championships. He won a gold medal in long distance at the 2021 World Orienteering Championships in Doksy, and silver medal in the sprint at the same championships, behind Isac von Krusenstierna. Fosser won the long distance, held near Heřmánky, in a time of 1:35:55, ahead of Matthias Kyburz and Magne Daehli. At the 2022 World Orienteering Championships he won the gold medal in the individual sprint, and a bronze in the mixed sprint relay.

Fosser has also competed in skyrunning, winning the U23 category in the combined Youth Skyrunning World Championships in 2021.

Personal life
Fosser is a grandson of former international orienteer Per Fosser.

References

External links
 

1999 births
Living people
Norwegian orienteers
Male orienteers
Foot orienteers
20th-century Norwegian people
21st-century Norwegian people
Junior World Orienteering Championships medalists
Competitors at the 2022 World Games
World Games medalists in orienteering
World Games gold medalists
World Games silver medalists